Bircher is a surname. Notable people with the surname include:

Alan Bircher (born 1981), British long-distance swimmer
Paul Bircher (1928–2019), British rower
Eugen Bircher (1882–1956), Swiss politician

See also
Maximilian Bircher-Benner (1867–1939), Swiss physician and pioneer in nutritional research